Maxwell Evans Rich (August 13, 1913 – July 29, 1979) was a major general in the United States Army. He also served as an  Adjutant General of the Utah National Guard. He was an Executive Vice President of the National Rifle Association (NRA).

Background
As Executive Vice President of the NRA from 1970 to 1977, succeeding General Franklin Orth and followed by Harlon Carter, he was part of the "Old Guard". He planned to sell the NRA HQ in Washington, DC, and move it to Colorado Springs, Colorado, and to reduce the organization's political involvement. He sought to return the NRA to what he saw as its heritage of shooting sports and marksmanship. However members of his own staff disagreed. A grassroots movement led by Neal Knox and Harlan Carter ousted Rich and the "old guard" as a result of the so-called "Cincinnati Revolt" or "Cincinnati Coup", which occurred at an annual meeting in 1977.

References

1913 births
1979 deaths
United States Army generals
Adjutants general of the National Guard of the United States
People from Utah
National Guard (United States) generals